Kevin Owen McCarthy (born January 26, 1965) is an American politician who is the 55th and current speaker of the United States House of Representatives. A member of the Republican Party, McCarthy is in his ninth House term, serving as the U.S. representative for California's 22nd congressional district from 2007 to 2013, the 23rd district from 2013 to 2023, and the 20th district since 2023. Concurrent with his house terms, he served as House Minority Leader from 2019 to 2023 and as House Majority Leader from 2014 to 2019 under Speakers John Boehner and Paul Ryan.

McCarthy was born in Bakersfield, California. He attended California State University, Bakersfield, while working as a firefighter. McCarthy formerly chaired the California Young Republicans and the Young Republican National Federation. He was a two-term representative in the California State Assembly from 2002 to 2006, the last two years as minority leader. He was elected to Congress in 2006. McCarthy was elected to House leadership in his second term as Republican Chief Deputy Whip from 2009 to 2011. When Republicans took control of the House in 2011, he became majority whip from 2011 until August 2014, when he was elected majority leader to replace the outgoing Eric Cantor, who was defeated in his primary election.

Following the Republican Party's loss in the 2018 midterm elections, McCarthy was elected House minority leader after Speaker Paul Ryan retired, making him the first California Republican to hold the post. McCarthy was a steady defender of former president Donald Trump for most of his time as majority leader and minority leader. McCarthy supported Trump's debunked claims of voter fraud after Joe Biden won the 2020 presidential election, and participated in efforts to overturn the results. After the January 6 United States Capitol attack, McCarthy blamed Trump for the riot and reversed his previous comments on there being voter fraud in the election. By 2022, however, he had walked back those comments and reconciled with Trump.

After Republicans gained the majority in the 2022 House elections, McCarthy was the Republican nominee for speaker when the 118th Congress convened in January 2023. Due to opposition from members of the Freedom Caucus, he failed to win the speakership until the 15th ballot, on January 7. It was the first time a speaker had not been elected on the first ballot since 1923, and the longest multi-ballot speaker election since 1859.

Early life and education
McCarthy was born on January 26, 1965, in Bakersfield, California, the son of Roberta Darlene ( Palladino), a homemaker, and Owen McCarthy, an assistant city fire chief. McCarthy is a fourth-generation resident of Kern County. His maternal grandfather was an Italian immigrant, and his paternal grandfather was Irish. McCarthy is the first Republican in his immediate family, as his parents were members of the Democratic Party. 

In 1984, 19-year-old McCarthy ran his first business selling sandwiches out of the back of his uncle’s yogurt shop on Stine Road.

He attended California State University, Bakersfield, where he obtained a Bachelor of Science in marketing in 1989 and a Master of Business Administration in 1994. During college, he worked as a seasonal firefighter for the Kern County Fire Department.

Early political career
McCarthy served on the staff of Congressman Bill Thomas from 1987 to 2002. In 1995, he chaired the California Young Republicans. From 1999 to 2001, he chaired the Young Republican National Federation. From the late 1990s until 2000, he was Thomas's district director. McCarthy won his first election in 2000, as a Kern Community College District trustee. Thomas has since criticized McCarthy in numerous interviews.

McCarthy was elected to the California State Assembly in 2002. He became the Republican floor leader in 2003. He was elected to the United States House of Representatives in 2006.

U.S. House of Representatives

Elections

2006

McCarthy entered the Republican primary for California's 22nd District after his former boss, Bill Thomas, retired. He won the three-way Republican primary—the real contest in this heavily Republican district—with 85% of the vote. He won the general election with 70.7% of the vote.

2008

McCarthy was unopposed for a second term.

2010

No party put up a challenger, and McCarthy won a third term with 98.8% of the vote, with opposition coming only from a write-in candidate.

2012

Redistricting before the 2012 election resulted in McCarthy's district being renumbered as the 23rd. It became somewhat more compact, losing its share of the Central Coast while picking up large parts of Tulare County. This district was as heavily Republican as its predecessor, and McCarthy won a fourth term with 73.2% of the vote vs. 26.8% for independent, No Party Preference (NPP) opponent, Terry Phillips. The district is based in Bakersfield and includes large sections of Kern and Tulare Counties, as well as part of the Quartz Hill community in northwest Los Angeles County.

2014

In his bid for a fifth term, McCarthy faced a Democratic challenger for the first time since his initial run for the seat, Raul Garcia. McCarthy was reelected with 74.8% of the vote.

2016

McCarthy was reelected to a sixth term in 2016 with 69.2% of the vote in the general election; the Democratic nominee, Wendy Reed, received 30.8%.

2018

McCarthy was reelected to a seventh term with 64.3% of the vote to Democratic challenger Tatiana Matta's 35.7%.

After Republicans lost their majority in the 2018 elections, McCarthy was elected House Minority Leader, fending off a challenge to his right from Jim Jordan of Ohio, 159–43.

2020

McCarthy was reelected to an eighth term with 62.1% of the vote, to Democratic challenger and United States Air Force veteran Kim Mangone's 37.9%.

2022

McCarthy defeated Democratic nominee Marisa Wood, winning reelection in 2022 with 67.2% of the vote.

Tenure

Committee assignments 

 Committee on Financial Services
 Subcommittee on Capital Markets, Insurance, and Government-Sponsored Enterprises
 Subcommittee on Financial Institutions and Consumer Credit

Caucus memberships
 Congressional Western Caucus

Party leadership
 House Republican steering committee
 House Republican Chief Deputy Whip, 2009–2011
 House Majority Whip, 2011–2014
 House Majority Leader, 2014–2019
 House Minority Leader, 2019–2023
 Speaker of the House,  2023–present

Early leadership posts
As a freshman congressman, McCarthy was appointed to the Republican Steering committee. Republican leader John Boehner appointed him chair of the Republican platform committee during the committee's meetings in Minneapolis in August 2008, which produced the Republican Party Platform for 2008. He was also one of the three founding members of the GOP Young Guns Program. After the 2008 elections, he was chosen as chief deputy minority whip, the highest-ranking appointed position in the House Republican Conference. His predecessor, Eric Cantor, was named minority whip.

House majority whip
On November 17, 2010, the House Republican Conference selected McCarthy to be the House majority whip in the 112th Congress. In this post, he was the third-ranking House Republican, behind Speaker John Boehner and majority leader Eric Cantor.

In August 2011, McCarthy and Cantor led a group of 30 Republican members of Congress to Israel, where some members took part in a late-night swim in the Sea of Galilee, including one member—Kevin Yoder—who swam nude. When McCarthy and Cantor later found out about the swim, they were "furious" and worried about negative news coverage, and "called a members-only meeting the next morning to reprimand the group—both those who swam and those who abstained".

In 2012, McCarthy's office reported spending $99,000 on pastries, bottled water, and other food items, making him the highest-spending member of the House in this category.

House majority leader
Cantor lost the June 2014 primary for his seat in Congress, and announced he would step down from House leadership at the end of July. McCarthy sought to succeed Cantor, and after some speculation that Pete Sessions and Jeb Hensarling would challenge him, both dropped out, leaving McCarthy a clear path to become majority leader. On June 13, representative Raul Labrador announced he would also seek the leadership position. On June 19, the Republican Conference elected McCarthy majority leader.

According to the University of Minnesota's Humphrey School of Public Affairs, McCarthy is the least-tenured majority leader in the history of the House of Representatives. When he assumed the position in July 2014, he had served only seven years, six months and 29 days, the least experience of any floor leader in the House's history by more than a year.

McCarthy kept four of his predecessor's staff members on his staff when he took over as majority leader, including deputy chief of staff Neil Bradley, who now has served in that role for three majority leaders.

McCarthy has been under fire for avoiding meetings and town-hall events with constituents in his congressional district for years. His last town hall was in June 2010. He has opted for screened telephone calls since.

In December 2017, McCarthy voted for the House Republican tax legislation. After the vote, he asked his constituents to "Come February, check your check, because that will be the pay raise of the vote for Donald Trump."

Unsuccessful 2015 candidacy for speaker of the House

On September 25, 2015, John Boehner decided to resign as speaker effective October 30, 2015. Many media outlets speculated that McCarthy would likely replace him, and Boehner himself said that McCarthy "would make an excellent speaker". On September 28, McCarthy formally announced his candidacy. Having held congressional office for less than nine years, McCarthy would have been the speaker with the least time in Congress since 1891.

In a September 29, 2015, interview with Fox News's Sean Hannity, McCarthy was asked what Republicans had accomplished in Congress. He replied by talking about the House of Representatives' special panel investigation into the 2012 Benghazi attack (in which Islamic militants attacked the American diplomatic compound in Benghazi, Libya). Republicans said the purpose of the government-funded committee was purely to investigate the deaths of four Americans. But McCarthy said, "Everybody thought Hillary Clinton was unbeatable, right? But we put together a Benghazi special committee, a select committee. What are her numbers today? Her numbers are dropping. Why? Because she's untrustable. But no one would have known any of that had happened had we not fought." The comment was seen as an admission that the investigation was a partisan political undertaking rather than a substantive inquiry. Some commentators described his remark as a classic "Kinsley gaffe" (defined as when a politician accidentally tells the truth). The remark was also described as "saying the quiet part loud". Several days later, McCarthy apologized for the remarks and said the Benghazi panel was not a political initiative.

On October 8, 2015, as Republicans were preparing to vote, McCarthy unexpectedly dropped out of the race, saying that Republicans needed a fresh face who could unite the caucus and "I am not that guy." He reportedly dropped out after concluding that he did not have the 218 votes that would be required to be elected speaker. McCarthy remained majority leader. The Benghazi gaffe contributed to his decision to withdraw from the race, as McCarthy acknowledged in announcing his withdrawal. Previously, Representative Walter B. Jones Jr. had sent a letter to the Republican Conference Chairwoman Cathy McMorris Rodgers stating that any candidates for a leadership position with "misdeeds" should withdraw from the race. Jones has said that his comment did not specifically refer to McCarthy.

House minority leader

After the Republicans lost their majority in the 2018 elections, McCarthy was elected Minority Leader, fending off a challenge to his right from Jim Jordan of Ohio, 159–43. While as majority leader he had been the second-ranking House Republican behind Ryan, as minority leader he was now the leader of the House Republicans.

McCarthy has been a strong supporter of Donald Trump since 2016. As minority leader, he remained a close Trump ally, keeping the Republican caucus unified in support of Trump and against his impeachment on two articles of impeachment arising from the Trump-Ukraine scandal. McCarthy associated with key figures in Trump's effort to enlist the Ukrainian government in discrediting Joe Biden, Trump's political opponent; such figures included Lev Parnas, Rudolph W. Giuliani, and Robert F. Hyde.

Like Trump, McCarthy supported Marjorie Taylor Greene, a Republican candidate in 2020 for a U.S. House seat from northwest Georgia; Greene's past racist, anti-Semitic comments and her promotion of QAnon (a far-right conspiracy theory) led other Republicans to distance themselves from her. McCarthy did not take steps to thwart Greene's candidacy and did not endorse her opponent in the Republican primary runoff election. After Greene was nominated, McCarthy denounced the fringe conspiracy, saying, "There is no place for QAnon in the Republican Party", and said that Greene had distanced herself from her earlier statements. In 2020, McCarthy was asked about Trump's false claims that Joe Scarborough (an MSNBC host and former Republican congressman) was linked to the death of a staff member; a few House Republicans criticized Trump for his use of inflammatory and false rhetoric, but McCarthy declined to take a position. McCarthy's predecessor, Bill Thomas, for whom McCarthy served as a staffer from 1987 through 2002, excoriated McCarthy for his failure to accept the result of the 2020 presidential election and unwillingness to fully confront Trump for his role in precipitating and maintaining the January 6, 2021, attack on the Capitol.

In May 2020, during the COVID-19 pandemic, McCarthy and House Republicans filed a lawsuit to stop the House of Representatives from allowing remote proxy voting by representatives, a measure that had been introduced under Speaker Nancy Pelosi to prevent the virus's spread in the Capitol. McCarthy and the other plaintiffs claimed that a quorum of members had to be physically present in the chamber to conduct business; Pelosi defended the rule as a critical public health measure and pointed to the Constitution authorizing each chamber of Congress to establish its own procedural rules. In August 2020, a federal judge dismissed McCarthy's lawsuit against Pelosi, ruling that the House has "absolute immunity from civil suit" under the Constitution's Speech or Debate Clause.

In November 2020, in the aftermath of the 2020 presidential election, McCarthy falsely insisted on Laura Ingraham's television show that "President Trump won this election"—echoing Trump's own claim—even as vote-counting was ongoing in several states. McCarthy insinuated that large-scale voter fraud would lead Trump to lose, saying "Everyone who is listening: Do not be quiet. Do not be silent about this. We cannot allow this to happen before our very eyes."

In December 2020, McCarthy was one of 126 Republican members of the House of Representatives to sign an amicus brief in support of Texas v. Pennsylvania, a lawsuit filed at the United States Supreme Court contesting the results of the 2020 presidential election. House Speaker Nancy Pelosi issued a statement that called signing the amicus brief an act of "election subversion". The Supreme Court declined to hear the case, on the basis that Texas lacked standing under Article III of the Constitution to challenge the results of an election held by another state. In March 2021, McCarthy denied he had supported Trump's false claims of election fraud, even though he had supported Texas v. Pennsylvania.

On January 6, 2021, hours after the attack on the Capitol, McCarthy voted against certifying Biden's win in two states. Cook Political Report House editor Dave Wasserman later reported that McCarthy had told him on several occasions before this vote that he knew Biden had won. He later denied that this was a vote to overturn the election, because Biden would still have won without those two states. McCarthy finally recognized Biden as president-elect on January 8, more than two months after the election.

During a January 8 conference call with other House Republican leaders, McCarthy said that Trump's conduct during the Capitol riot was "atrocious and totally wrong" and that he was "inciting people" to attack the Capitol, and briefly inquired about invoking the 25th Amendment to remove him from office. On a January 10 conference call with Republican leaders, McCarthy said he would ask Trump to resign rather than go through a long impeachment battle, adding, "I've had it with this guy." During the same call he also expressed a wish that tech companies such as Facebook and Twitter would strip some Republican lawmakers of their social media accounts. But after weak House Republican support for Trump's second impeachment, fearing retribution from Trump and his allies, McCarthy backed off from this stance.

A week after the attack, McCarthy delivered a speech in which he held Trump partially responsible for the riots. He emphasized that Trump failed to intervene after the initial TV footage, showing the demonstration evolving in a violent assault. He later said that he did not believe Trump had provoked the mob. On January 28, McCarthy paid Trump a visit at his Mar-a-Lago residence. Officially the topic was said to be "regaining the lost votes in the midterm elections of 2022", but it was widely reported as an attempt to mend fences with Trump and lessen tensions in the Republican Party.

During the second impeachment trial of Donald Trump, Congresswoman Jaime Herrera Beutler said that Trump said to McCarthy during the ongoing attack on the Capitol by rioters: "Well, Kevin, I guess these people are more upset about the election than you are." She was not called as a witness but her statement was included in the impeachment documents.

In April 2021, before closing arguments in the Derek Chauvin trial, Maxine Waters said, "I hope we're going to get a verdict that will say guilty, guilty, guilty. And if we don't, we cannot go away" and need to get "more confrontational". After her comments, McCarthy said, "Waters is inciting violence in Minneapolis just as she has incited it in the past. If Speaker Pelosi doesn't act against this dangerous rhetoric, I will bring action this week."

Because of her stance on the Capitol riot, her vote to impeach Trump and vocal opposition to his false stolen election narrative, in early 2021 pro-Trump Freedom Caucus House members attempted to remove Liz Cheney as chair of the House Republican Conference, the third-ranking position in the Republican House leadership. The initial effort failed, but growing numbers of House Republicans supported her removal; McCarthy agreed to a party vote in May, resulting in Cheney's ouster. Hours after the vote, McCarthy said, "I don't think anybody is questioning the legitimacy of the presidential election", but a CNN poll released days earlier found that 70% of Republicans did believe the false stolen election narrative. In October 2021, McCarthy pressured Republican political consultants not to work with Cheney or else lose business with other Republicans.

On May 18, 2021, McCarthy announced that he opposed the bipartisan agreement in the House to form an independent commission to investigate the Capitol attack. McCarthy had asked Representative John Katko, a member of his whip team, to negotiate with Democrats on the caucus's behalf about the commission. McCarthy specified to Katko what he and Senate Minority Leader Mitch McConnell wanted, and got almost everything he asked for. McCarthy also said that the scope of any investigation should include other events of political violence, which was possible with the terms negotiated. McCarthy sided with other Republicans who sought to downplay the matter and move on. In June 2021, after Pelosi announced the creation of a select committee to investigate the Capitol attack that would include five Republican members, McCarthy threatened to remove Republicans from committee assignments if they participated.

In July 2021, the delta variant of the coronavirus prompted the Attending Physician of the United States Congress to reimpose a mask requirement in the House chamber. McCarthy called this "a decision conjured up by liberal government officials who want to continue to live in a perpetual pandemic state", prompting Pelosi to respond to reporters, "he's such a moron." On July 31, 2021, members of Tennessee's Republican congressional delegation gave McCarthy a large gavel with the words "Fire Pelosi" inscribed on it. McCarthy told them, "it will be hard not to hit her with it, but I will bang it down."

In August 2021, after the House Select Committee on the January 6 Attack asked telecommunications and social media companies to retain certain records, McCarthy said that if the companies "turn over private information" to the committee, they would be "in violation of federal law and subject to losing their ability to operate in the United States", and that a future Republican legislative majority would hold them "fully accountable". McCarthy did not specify which law the companies would break in this situation.

As of October 2021, McCarthy had voted in line with President Joe Biden's stated position 15% of the time.

On November 18, 2021, and into the early morning of November 19, McCarthy gave a record-breaking 8.5-hour speech on the House floor using the "magic minute", forcing a delay in the final vote on the Build Back Better Act.

On May 12, 2022, the January 6 Committee subpoenaed McCarthy and Republican representatives Jim Jordan, Mo Brooks, Scott Perry and Andy Biggs. In December, the committee referred McCarthy, Jordan, Perry and Biggs to the House Ethics Committee for disobeying the subpoenas.

Speaker of the House

118th Congress

Republicans won back control of the House in the 2022 election cycle, marking the first time since the 115th Congress that Republicans held a majority, though it was narrower than many party officials and political pundits had predicted. McCarthy won an internal Republican conference vote in early November, with 188 votes to Andy Biggs's 31, but some members of the conference continued to oppose his bid for the speakership. At the start of the 118th Congress on January 3, 2023, McCarthy failed to secure a majority of votes cast on the first ballot, with all Democrats and 19 Republicans opposing him. This marked the first time since the December 1923 speaker election that the first ballot did not produce a speaker. McCarthy finally received a majority and became speaker on the 15th ballot on January 7, after making key concessions to some members of the right-wing Freedom Caucus, including a rule to allow a single House member to introduce a vote to remove the speaker, as well as granting Freedom Caucus members three seats on the influential Rules Committee.

In February 2023, McCarthy released over 40,000 hours of security video of the January 6 Capitol attack to Fox News host Tucker Carlson, prompting criticism from colleagues such as House Minority Leader Hakeem Jeffries and Senate Majority Leader Chuck Schumer. Days later, Carlson aired several minutes of the video during his program to assert government investigators had exaggerated the degree of criminality during the attack. Justice Department prosecutors said that in one case Carlson's video clips were misleadingly edited to cast one prominent Capitol intruder in a favorable light, to suggest he had been unjustly prosecuted, but omitted video of him engaged in criminal activity.

In March 2023, Ukrainian President Volodymyr Zelenskyy invited McCarthy to visit Ukraine. McCarthy declined, saying he opposed giving "blank checks" to Ukraine and didn't need to visit Ukraine to know whether the money was necessary. He also announced he had planned a meeting with the President of Taiwan, Tsai Ing-wen, in the U.S.

Political positions

Abortion 
In 2003, while minority leader in the state assembly, McCarthy "support[ed] most abortion rights, but oppose[d] spending tax dollars on abortions". By 2015, McCarthy was, according to The Washington Post, "a staunch anti-abortion-rights advocate". McCarthy supports the Hyde Amendment (a provision, annually renewed by Congress since 1976, that bans federal funds for abortion, except to save the life of the woman, or if the pregnancy arises from incest or rape), and in 2011 co-sponsored a bill, the "No Taxpayer Funding for Abortion Act", to make the Hyde Amendment permanent. This bill was especially controversial because it provided an exemption for funding terminations of pregnancies caused by only "forcible rape", which prompted abortion-rights activists to call the bill a redefinition of rape. McCarthy opposes a California state law that requires health insurance plans "to treat abortion coverage and maternity coverage neutrally and provide both" on the grounds that the law violates the Weldon Amendment and other federal laws.

McCarthy has voted to strip about $500 million in federal funding for Planned Parenthood.

COVID-19 
On September 17, 2020, McCarthy voted against House Resolution 908 to condemn racism against Asian-Americans related to the COVID-19 pandemic. He said the resolution was "a waste of time", and "At the heart of this resolution is the absurd notion that referring to the virus as a Wuhan virus or the China virus is the same as contributing to violence against Asian Americans."

Donald Trump 

McCarthy was an early supporter of Trump in the 2016 Republican presidential primaries, saying that Trump's "intensity" could help the Republicans win House seats. McCarthy also suggested in a private recording with GOP House leadership in 2016 that Putin pays Trump, which McCarthy said was a joke gone wrong.

After the 2018 midterm elections, in which Democrats won a majority in the House, McCarthy said that Democrats should not investigate Trump. He described investigations of Trump as a "small agenda" and that "America's too great of a nation to have such a small agenda." He said that Trump had already been investigated "for a long period of time". McCarthy and other House Republicans investigated Hillary Clinton for years over the 2012 Benghazi attack. In 2015, McCarthy said that the investigation, which found no evidence of wrongdoing on Clinton's part, had hurt poll numbers.

In 2019, McCarthy defended government officials spending money at resorts Trump owned. He said there was no difference between government officials spending money at hotels Trump owned and other hotels.

In October 2019, McCarthy said "there's nothing that the president did wrong" in regard to Trump requesting that Ukrainian President Volodymyr Zelenskyy investigate 2020 Democratic presidential candidate Joe Biden. McCarthy added: "The president wasn't investigating a campaign rival. The president was trying to get to the bottom, just as every American would want to know, why did we have this Russia hoax that actually started within Ukraine."

That same month, when Trump said "China should start an investigation into the Bidens", McCarthy shortly thereafter went on Fox & Friends to say, "You watch what the president said—he's not saying China should investigate."

Capitol riot and reaction 

In 2021, of the attack on the United States Capitol on January 6, McCarthy said that "as a nation", "we all have some responsibility" for the event. McCarthy had been among those Republicans who in the weeks before the attack on the Capitol had spread false claims about the validity of the presidential election. On January 13, McCarthy said that Trump "bears responsibility for Wednesday's attack on Congress by mob rioters. He should have immediately denounced the mob when he saw what was unfolding." McCarthy did not vote to impeach Trump for a second time, instead calling for a censure resolution against Trump for his role in the attack. On January 21, McCarthy said he did not think that Trump "provoked" the attack. Two days later, McCarthy said that Trump "had some responsibility when it came to the response", and then stressed his original position that all Americans have "some responsibility". Republicans have criticized McCarthy for inconsistent statements about Trump after the attack. Despite the condemnation, McCarthy visited Trump at his Mar-a-Lago resort to discuss the future of the Republican Party. McCarthy released a statement that read in part, "Today, President Trump committed to helping elect Republicans in the House and Senate in 2022".

It was reported on February 12 that McCarthy called Trump asking for help during the riot. Trump refused to send the National Guard, saying, "Well, Kevin, I guess these people are more upset about the election than you are." McCarthy responded, "Who the fuck do you think you are talking to?" This was reported to CNN by multiple Republican members of Congress, including Jaime Herrera Beutler and Anthony Gonzalez.

On May 19, 2021, McCarthy and all the other Republican House leaders in the 117th Congress voted against establishing the January 6 commission. Thirty-five Republican House members and all 217 Democrats present voted to establish such a commission.

Environment 

McCarthy has been frequently at odds with environmental groups; the League of Conservation Voters has given him a lifetime score of 4%, as of 2021. McCarthy does not accept the scientific consensus on climate change, as of 2014. He was a major opponent of President Barack Obama's Clean Power Plan to reduce emissions of greenhouse gas from coal-fired power plants. He has opposed regulations on methane leaks from fossil-fuel drilling facilities, calling them "bureaucratic and unnecessary." In 2015, McCarthy opposed the U.S.'s involvement in global efforts to combat climate change; as the 2015 United Nations Climate Change Conference began, he announced that he would oppose an international agreement on climate change. In 2017, McCarthy led House Republican efforts to use the Congressional Review Act to undo a number of environmental regulations enacted during the Obama administration. McCarthy once supported the federal wind-energy production tax credit, but opposed its extension in 2014.

In 2011, McCarthy was the primary author of the "Wilderness and Roadless Area Release Act" (H.R. 1581), legislation that would remove protected status designation from 60 million acres of public lands. Under the bill, protections for roadless and wilderness study areas would be eliminated, and vast swaths of land opened to new industrial development (such as logging, mineral extraction, and fossil fuel extraction). Conservationist groups and former Secretary of the Interior Bruce Babbitt strongly criticized the bill.

More recently, as House minority leader, McCarthy proposed several environmental bills designed to address climate change that have been called "narrow" and "modest". They include provisions to extend a tax credit for carbon capture technologies and to plant trees. Responses from Republican representatives were mixed. Conservative groups including the Club for Growth, the Competitive Enterprise Institute, and the American Energy Alliance opposed the measures, while others, such as ClearPath, supported them. McCarthy believes that younger voters are worried about climate change and cautioned that Republicans are risking their viability in elections over the long term by ignoring or denying the issue. He has said, "We've got to actually do something different than we've done to date [concerning climate change]. For a 28-year-old, the environment is the No. 1 and No. 2 issue."

Finance 
In 2014, McCarthy opposed the renewal of the charter of the Export-Import Bank of the United States, as he expects the private sector to take over the role.

Foreign policy 
On June 15, 2016, McCarthy told a group of Republicans, "There's two people I think Putin pays: Rohrabacher and Trump. Swear to God." Paul Ryan reminded colleagues the meeting was off the record, saying, "No leaks. This is how we know we're a real family here." When asked about the comment, McCarthy's spokesman said, "the idea that McCarthy would assert this is absurd and false." After a tape of the comment was made public in May 2017, McCarthy claimed it was "a bad attempt at a joke".

McCarthy received donations from pro-Israel groups in the 2018 United States elections. He is also Congress's top recipient of campaign contributions from Saudi lobbying firms.

In 2019, McCarthy threatened to take action against two members of Congress, Rashida Tlaib and Ilhan Omar, who had sharply criticized the Israeli government's policies in the Palestinian territories and embraced the Boycott, Divestment and Sanctions movement. He said that if Democrats "do not take action I think you'll see action from myself".

McCarthy voiced support for Hong Kong protesters. He wrote, "the NBA seems more worried about losing business than standing up for freedom."

In January 2020, after the United States assassinated Iranian General Qasem Soleimani, McCarthy criticized Nancy Pelosi for "defending" Soleimani.

McCarthy said he supported Israel's planned annexation of the West Bank. He signed a letter addressed to Israeli Prime Minister Benjamin Netanyahu that reaffirms "the unshakeable alliance between the United States and Israel".

During Trump's presidency, McCarthy praised the administration's plans to leave Afghanistan. When the Biden administration withdrew from Afghanistan, McCarthy assailed Biden for the manner and execution of the withdrawal.

Health care 
As House Majority Leader, McCarthy led efforts to repeal the Patient Protection and Affordable Care Act (ACA or Obamacare). In March 2017, the House Republican repeal legislation, the American Health Care Act, was pulled from the floor minutes before a scheduled vote. After changes made during an internal Republican debate, the bill narrowly passed the House, 217–213, in a May 2017 party-line vote. The House Republican leadership's decision to hold a vote on the legislation before receiving a budget-impact analysis from the nonpartisan Congressional Budget Office was controversial. The CBO subsequently issued a report estimating that the bill would cause 23 million Americans to lose health coverage and would reduce the deficit by $119 billion over 10 years. McCarthy and other House Republican leaders defended the legislation.

Immigration 
Throughout 2018, McCarthy opposed efforts to codify the legal status of DREAMers after Trump suspended Deferred Action for Childhood Arrivals (DACA), which provided temporary stay for undocumented immigrants brought to the U.S. as minors. McCarthy opposed efforts to codify the DACA protection because he thought it would depress turnout among the Republican base in the 2018 elections. According to Politico, it was thought a DACA-type bill could have also undermined McCarthy's chances of becoming House Speaker after Paul Ryan retired from Congress, as it would have made it harder for him to attract the support of hard-line conservatives.

In July 2018, House Democrats called for a floor vote that sought to abolish U.S. Immigration and Customs Enforcement (ICE). House GOP leaders scrapped the latter and called for the House to vote on a resolution authored by McCarthy and Clay Higgins to support ICE. House Speaker Paul Ryan's spokeswoman said Democrats "will now have the chance to stand with the majority of Americans who support ICE and vote for this resolution", or otherwise follow "extreme voices on the far left calling for abolishment of an agency that protects us".

In June 2019, Alexandria Ocasio-Cortez compared the holding centers for undocumented immigrants at the Mexico–United States border to "concentration camps". McCarthy strongly criticized her words, saying they showed disrespect for Holocaust victims.

LGBT rights 
McCarthy was a supporter of the Defense of Marriage Act (DOMA), which barred federal recognition of same-sex marriage and banned same-sex couples from receiving federal spousal benefits; after Obama instructed the Justice Department not to defend the law in court, McCarthy supported House Republicans' legal defense of the law. When the DOMA case reached the Supreme Court in 2013, McCarthy joined Boehner and Eric Cantor in signing a brief urging the Court to uphold the law. In 2022, he voted against the Respect for Marriage Act, which codified key elements of Obergefell v Hodges and formally repealed DOMA.

Cannabis
McCarthy has a D− rating from National Organization for the Reform of Marijuana Laws for his voting record on cannabis-related matters. He voted against allowing veterans access to medical marijuana, if legal in their state and recommended by their Veterans Health Administration doctor.

Other issues
In August 2018, McCarthy co-signed a letter spearheaded by John Garamendi, Jared Huffman and Mike Thompson calling on Trump to "send more federal aid to fight" the wildfires in California. The letter in effect requests a "major disaster declaration" across several counties affected by the fires; such a designation would "free up more federal relief" aimed at local governments and individuals affected.

McCarthy introduced the FORWARD Act in 2018, which "would provide $95 million in research funding for valley fever and other fungal diseases". The bill provides $5 million for a "blockchain pilot program", facilitating sharing data between doctors and scientists researching such diseases. It would also fund $8 million in matching grant money to be awarded every year for five years to local groups applying for research grants, as well as $10 million each year for five years to CARB-X, a U.S. Department of Health and Human Services public-private partnership.

On October 23, 2018, McCarthy tweeted that Democratic donors businessman George Soros, businessman Tom Steyer and former New York Mayor Mike Bloomberg were trying to "buy" the upcoming election. He tweeted this a day after a pipe bomb was delivered to Soros's home. Steyer said McCarthy's tweet was a "straight-up antisemitic move" because the three Democrats are Jewish. A vandal threw rocks at McCarthy's office and stole equipment from it, reportedly in reaction to McCarthy's tweet. McCarthy later deleted the tweet but refused to apologize.

In August 2019, McCarthy blamed the 2019 Dayton shooting on video games, saying, "The idea of these video games, they dehumanize individuals to have a game of shooting individuals and others".

Beginning with his time as a Dublin city councillor, Eric Swalwell was targeted by a Chinese woman believed to be a clandestine officer of China's Ministry of State Security. McCarthy called Swalwell, who served on the House Permanent Select Committee on Intelligence, a "national security threat".

Claims of social media censorship
McCarthy claims that social media platforms like Twitter actively censor conservative politicians and their supporters. He called on former Twitter CEO Jack Dorsey to testify before Congress on the matter. On August 17, 2018, McCarthy submitted a tweet to suggest that conservatives were being censored by showing a screen capture of conservative commentator Laura Ingraham's Twitter account with a sensitive content warning on one of her tweets. This warning was due to McCarthy's own Twitter default settings rather than any censorship from the platform. McCarthy also suggested that Google was biased against Republicans due to short-lived vandalism of the English Wikipedia entry on the California Republican Party being automatically indexed in Google search results.

Personal life

McCarthy and his wife, Judy, have two children. They are lifelong residents of Bakersfield. He and his family are Baptists and members of the Southern Baptist Convention.

He is a former board member for the Community Action Partnership of Kern. 

In October 2015, McCarthy was accused of having an affair with Representative Renee Ellmers. He had unexpectedly dropped out of the race for Speaker of the House shortly before the allegations surfaced. Days earlier, Representative Walter B. Jones Jr. had sent Republican Conference chair Cathy McMorris Rodgers a letter stating that any candidates for a leadership position with "misdeeds" should withdraw from the race. McCarthy and Ellmers have denied the allegation.

An October 2018 investigation documented how William "Bill" Wages, of McCarthy's brother-in-law's company Vortex Construction, has received $7.6 million since 2000 in no-bid and other prime federal contracts. The work was mostly for construction projects at the Naval Air Weapons Station China Lake in McCarthy's Bakersfield-based district, and Naval Air Station Lemoore in California's Kings County.

McCarthy is a fan of the Los Angeles Dodgers.

References

External links

 Congressman Kevin McCarthy official U.S. House website
 House Speaker website
 
 

|-

|-

|-

|-

|-

|-

|-

|-

|-

|-

|-

|-

1965 births
20th-century American businesspeople
21st-century American politicians
American food industry businesspeople
American people of Irish descent
American people of Italian descent
Baptists from California
Baptists from the United States
Businesspeople from California
California State University, Bakersfield alumni
Living people
United States congressional aides
Republican Party members of the California State Assembly
Politicians from Bakersfield, California
Protestants from California
Republican Party members of the United States House of Representatives from California
Majority leaders of the United States House of Representatives
Minority leaders of the United States House of Representatives
Speakers of the United States House of Representatives
Southern Baptists